The 2017 National Sports Sedan Series was an Australian motor racing competition for Group 3D Sports Sedans and Class TA Trans Am cars.
It was the 34th national series for Sports Sedans.

The series was won by Birol Cetin driving a Chevrolet Camaro.

Race calendar 
The series was contested over five rounds, each comprising three races.

Points system
Points were awarded in each race at each round of the series as follows:

Series standings

References

External links
 National Sports Sedan Series Gallery 2017, sportssedansnational.com.au, as archived at web.archive.org

Sports Sedans Series
National Sports Sedan Series